Shankaracharya ("Shankara-acharya") is a religious title used by the heads of amnaya monasteries called mathas in the Advaita Vedanta tradition of Hinduism. The title derives from Adi Shankara; teachers from the successive line of teachers retrospectively dated back to him are known as Shankaracharyas.

Establishment of the tradition 
According to a tradition developed in the 16th century, Adi Shankara set up four monasteries known as Mathas or Peethams, in the North, South, East and West of India, to be held by realised men who would be known as Shankaracharyas. They would take on the role of teacher and could be consulted by anyone with sincere queries of a spiritual nature. Another monastery Kanchi Kamkoti Peeth in south India also derives its establishment and tradition to Adi Shankara, however its heads are called "Acharya" or "Jagadguru" instead of "Shankaracharya".

The table below gives an overview of the four main Shankaracharya Amnaya Mathas reputedly founded by Adi Shankara, and their details.

Etymology 
The word Shankaracharya is  composed of two parts, Shankara and Acharya.  Acharya is a Sanskrit word meaning "teacher", so Shankaracharya means "teacher of the way of Shankara".

Further reading
 Mukhyananda, Swami (2006) Sri Shankaracharya: life and philosophy: An elucidative and reconciliatory interpretation, 4th ed.; ; Kolkata; Advaita Ashrama
 Esoteric Buddhism by A.P. Sinnett, pp 81

See also 
Adi Shankara
Kalady, Kerala - the holy birthplace of Jagadguru Adi Shankaracharya
Govardhan Peetham (East), Puri, Odisha
Dwarka Sharada Peetham (West), Dwarka, Gujarat
Jyotirmath Peetham (North), Jyotirmath, Badrikashram, Uttarakhand
Shri Sringeri Sharada Peetham (South), Sringeri, Karnataka
Shri Kanchi Kamakoti Peetham, Kancheepuram, Tamil Nadu
Sri Jayendra Saraswathi, Shankaracharya of Kanchi
Swami Abhinava Vidya Tīrtha, Shankaracharya of Sringeri
Swami Bharati Tīrtha, Shankaracharya of Sringeri
Swami Bharatikrishna Tīrtha, scholar; mathematician; first Sankaracharya to visit the West
Swami Brahmananda Sarasvati, Srividya siddh Sankaracharya of Jyotirmaya Pitha, Shankara Matha, Badrinath
Swami Shantanand Saraswati; Shankaracharya of Jyotirmaya Pitha
Swami Swarupananda Sarasvati; Shankaracharya of Jyotirmaya Pitha, Sankara Matha, Badrinath
Swami Candrasekhara Bharati, Shankaracharya of Sringeri
Swami Saccidananda Bharati, Shankaracharya of Sringeri
Swami Sacchidananda Bharati;Shankaracharya of Sringeri
Swami Sacchidananda Shivabhinava Nṛusimha Bharati; Shankaracharya of Sringeri

Swami Vidyaranya Tīrtha, Shankaracharya of Sringeri
Sri Sri Raghaveshwara Bharati, Jagadguru of Ramachandrapura Matha

References

External links
 
 Advaita-Vedanta.org  "Dasanami Sampradaya - The Monastic Tradition", an account of the four amnaya mathas, and the "Dashanamī parampāra"
  "History of Jagadguru Sri Adi Shankara Bhagavatpada",  "Biography of Jagadguru Sri Adi Shankaracharya"

Titles and occupations in Hinduism
Religious leadership roles